Lake Pitihkwakew 102B is an Indian reserve of the Muskeg Lake Cree Nation in Saskatchewan. It is 35 kilometres northwest of Blaine Lake.

References

Indian reserves in Saskatchewan
Division No. 16, Saskatchewan